Golden Kite may refer to:

Golden Kite Award, a literary award given by the Society of Children's Book Writers and Illustrators
Golden Kite Prize, the top film award in Vietnam
Order of the Golden Kite, an order of the Empire of Japan
"The Golden Kite, the Silver Wind", a 1953 short story by Ray Bradbury